Ulises Israel Cardona Carrillo (born 13 November 1998) is a Mexican professional footballer who plays as a winger.

International career
Cardona was included in the under-21 roster that participated in the 2018 Toulon Tournament, where Mexico would finish runners-up.

Cardona was called up by Jaime Lozano to participate with the under-22 team at the 2019 Toulon Tournament, where Mexico won third place. He was called up by Lozano again to participate at the 2019 Pan American Games, with Mexico winning the third-place match.

Career statistics

Club

Honours
Mexico U23
Pan American Bronze Medal: 2019

References

External links
 

1998 births
Living people
Mexican footballers
Association football midfielders
Atlas F.C. footballers
Mazatlán F.C. footballers
Liga MX players
Tercera División de México players
Footballers from Guadalajara, Jalisco
Pan American Games medalists in football
Pan American Games bronze medalists for Mexico
Footballers at the 2019 Pan American Games
Medalists at the 2019 Pan American Games